Burness Paull LLP is a leading Scottish commercial firm of solicitors, with offices in Edinburgh, Glasgow and Aberdeen, acting for private and public sector clients.  It is notable for its strengths in corporate law and energy law. It was formed in December 2012 through a merger between the firms of Burness, headquartered in Edinburgh and with a second office in Glasgow, and Paull & Williamsons, based in Aberdeen. The combined turnover of the two firms is more than £53 million, making it one of the largest firms in Scotland. The firm enjoys strong referrals from the City and a diverse portfolio of international clients through its oil and gas practice.

The firm is ranked as a top tier practice by both Legal 500 and Chambers.  Legal 500 in particular describes Burness Paull as "a major top-tier independent full-service commercial law firm."  It goes on to outline that "In the last year it has represented clients and project managed over £100bn of deals."  The Legal 500 review concludes by saying that "...the firm has highly resourced teams with extensive experience in corporate; commercial; intellectual property; property and planning; finance; employment and pensions; health, safety and environmental; construction; dispute resolution; and private capital." In September 2018, he was named as  Legal Advisor of the Year at the 2018 Scottish Business Insider Deals & Dealmakers Awards.

Services
Burness's business was grounded in corporate law, commercial property and dispute resolution. Legal directory Chambers & Partners identified it as a Band 1 firm for Local Government, Media & Entertainment, Partnership, Real Estate and Real Estate Litigation. In the significantly smaller marketplace of Aberdeen and the North, Paull & Williamsons was ranked Band 1 for Banking & Finance, Construction, Corporate/Mergers & Acquisitions, Employment, Health & Safety, Defendant Personal Injury, Planning, Real Estate, and Restructuring/Insolvency.

The new firm's seven identified sectors are Banking, Energy, Financial Services, Food and Drink, Private Equity, Property & Infrastructure, and Public Sector.

References

Law firms of Scotland
Companies based in Edinburgh
2012 establishments in Scotland
British companies established in 2012
Law firms established in 2012